The 1938 Kentucky Wildcats football team was an American football team that represented the University of Kentucky as a member of the Southeastern Conference (SEC) during the 1938 college football season. In their first season under head coach Albert D. Kirwan, the Wildcats compiled an overall record of 2–7 with a mark of 0–4 against conference opponents, finished in 12th place in the SEC, and were outscored by a total of 160 to 150. The team played its home games at McLean Stadium in Lexington, Kentucky.

Schedule

References

Kentucky
Kentucky Wildcats football seasons
Kentucky Wildcats football